Belinda Nana Ekua Amoah (born 26 December 1979), popularly known as Mzbel, is a Ghanaian Hiplife artist. She is the CEO of Mzbel Music, Bel Group, Bel Eye Media and others. Mzbel is a radio presenter and also an actor, having appeared in several movies. She is a global ambassador for people with disability. In 2022, She was made the brand ambassador for Pinamang Cosmetics.

Early life and education
Growing up in James Town, she attended the God Wisdom Preparatory schools, and continued to Korle Gonno 1 and Owusu Mills' JHS at Mamprobi [a suburb of Accra] for her Junior High School Education. Mzbel has admitted she took to skin bleaching in her teen years because it was the norm in Jamestown 

Mzbel then continued to pursue Secondary education at the Abuakwa State College. She studied general arts majoring in economics, geography and French. She then applied to study at the Ghana Institute of Languages, and trained to become a bilingual secretary.

Music career 
After her course at the GIL and a stint with Manifold Tutorial College, she earned an internship slot with GBC Radio 1 where she hosted a children's programme "Mmofra Kyepem". From GBC Radio 1 she joined Groove FM, [now Adom FM], as an intern and co - hosted a child focused programme titled ‘Kids on Groove’.

Haven worked with Groove FM for a while, the pursuit of higher laurels led Mzbel to TV3 as a production assistant for one of the station's youth centered programmes known as Goldblast. She worked also as floor manager for same and also as a production assistant for another programme "Talking Drum".

In the year 2002, Mzbel had the opportunity to work with Hush Hush Studios, which at that time had come on the scene as a new production firm. While at Hush Hush, she sometimes would be asked into the studio, and as the technicians played their instruments, she sang along, songs she had created. These were songs she would usually sing to herself with no serious intention of pursuing a music career. While working part - time at Hush Hush Studios, she secured another job, at Metro TV as the only digital video editor and also producer for 'Smash TV’, a weekend entertainment programme.

From Metro TV she was employed by Apex Advertising as a video editor and production manager. She had to combine Music and her job roles at Apex, and when she found the two overly demanding, Mzbel chose to give the music the full span of her attention. Over time, she has been criticized for her choice of clothes which have been described as "sexy" or "skimpy". in her own words, Mzbel believes however that as an artiste you must look unique. She has always had the ambition to be a source of inspiration to the under privileged and to be able to help the down trodden.  2022, she signed onto Ginger Global Music Distribution.

Discography

Album 
16 years 

Tongues 

Awoso Me 

Legelege 

Saucy Girl 

Edey Be

Singles 
She Saw Me 

Asibolanga 

Gamashi Life

Videography

External links

References 

Ghanaian highlife musicians
Living people
Musicians from Accra
21st-century Ghanaian women singers
21st-century Ghanaian singers
Abuakwa State College alumni
1979 births